Moses was the reputed author of the Biblical Pentateuch and protagonist of the Book of Exodus.

Moses may also refer to:

People
 Moses (given name)
 Moses (surname)

Places
 Moses Coulee, Washington, United States
 Moses Fork, a stream in West Virginia, United States
 Moses Lake, a lake in Grant County, Washington, United States
 Mount Moses, Hudson Mountains, Ellsworth Land, Antarctica

Arts and entertainment

Film and television
 Moses (miniseries), a 1995 TV miniseries
 Moses (TV programme), a 2002 British documentary

Literature
 Book of Moses, part of the Mormon scriptural canon
 Moses: A Narrative, a 1976 poem by Anthony Burgess
 Moses: When Harriet Tubman Led Her People to Freedom, a 2006 children's picture book by Carole Boston Weatherford and Kadir Nelson
 Moses the raven, a fictional character in George Orwell's Animal Farm

Music
 Moses (Bruch), an 1895 oratorio by Max Bruch
 Moses (Rubinstein), an 1892 opera by Anton Rubinstein
 Moses  (Skoryk), a 2001 opera by Myroslav Skoryk
 Moses, a 2014 musical by Sight & Sound Theatres
 "Moses" (Coldplay song), 2003
 "Moses" (French Montana song), 2015
 "Moses", a song by Jonathan Emile, 2019
 "Moses", a song by Patty Griffin from Living with Ghosts, 1996

Sculpture and painting
 Moses (1968), a series of three painted steel statues created by Tony Smith
 Moses (3/3), the third in the series, at the Toledo Museum of Art, Ohio, US
 Moses (Michelangelo), a c.1513–1515 marble sculpture
 Moses, Notre Dame, a sculpture on the campus of the University of Notre Dame, Indiana, US
 Moses, a 1977 painting by Robert B. Sherman

Other uses
 Moses (horse) (1819–1836), a British Thoroughbred racehorse
 Moses (machine translation), a free statistical machine translation engine
 MOSES (spacecraft), a Manned Orbiting Shuttle Escape System proposed by General Electric
 Moses, a mule used by American mail carrier Mary Fields
 Metropolitan Organizing Strategy Enabling Strength, an American interfaith group
 Military Open Simulator Enterprise Strategy, a U.S. Army training research project
 Operation Moses, a 1984 Jewish evacuation mission

See also
 
 
 Black Moses (disambiguation)
 MOSE Project, an aquatic barrier tracing its name to Moses
 Moshe, nickname for Neanderthal skeleton found in Kebara Cave 
 MOSIS, acronym for Metal Oxide Semiconductor Implementation Service